The Journal of Ornithology (formerly Journal für Ornithologie) is a scientific journal published by Springer Science+Business Media on behalf of the Deutsche Ornithologen-Gesellschaft. It was founded by Jean Cabanis in 1853, becoming the official journal of the Deutsche Ornithologen-Gesellschaft in 1854.

The first issue was produced in January 1853 and Cabanis noted that although there were specialist journals in entomology and conchology that there was nothing to deal with ornithology in Germany. Among the first essays published in the journal, was an essay by Reichenbach on the concept of species.

According to the Journal Citation Reports, the journal has a 2012 impact factor of 1.632.

See also
 List of ornithology journals

References

External links 
 
 Pre-1923 scanned issues

Journals and magazines relating to birding and ornithology
Quarterly journals
Springer Science+Business Media academic journals
Publications established in 1853
English-language journals